Jasad may refer to:

 Jatiyo Samajtantrik Dal, a political party in Bangladesh
 Jasad (magazine), an Arabic-language cultural magazine
 Jasad (band), an Indonesian death metal band